Elections to the Himachal Pradesh Legislative Assembly were held in September 1993 to elect members of the 68 constituencies in Himachal Pradesh, India. The Indian National Congress won the popular vote and a majority of seats and its leader, Virbhadra Singh was appointed as the Chief Minister of Himachal Pradesh for his second term. The number of constituencies was set as 68 by the recommendation of the Delimitation Commission of India.

The Himachal Pradesh Legislative Assembly or the Himachal Pradesh Vidhan Sabha is the unicameral legislature of the Indian state of Himachal Pradesh. The present strength of the Vidhan Sabha is 68.

Result

Elected members

By-elections
Shri Adarsh Kumar Sood was elected in a by-election caused by the unseating of the sitting Member Shri Rakesh Singha from Shimla.
Smt. Anita Verma was elected in a by-election caused at the demise of Shri Jagdev Chand who died immediately after the declaration of results.
Shri Durga Chand was elected in a by-election in 1995 from Sulah at the death of Shri Man Chand Rana.
Shri Jagat Singh Negi was elected in a by-election in 1995 at the death of the sitting MLA Shri Dev Raj Negi.
Shri Ranjeet Singh Bakshi was elected in October, 1996 in a by-election. The vacancy was caused due to the election of the then sitting Member Shri Sat Mahajan to Lok Sabha.

See also
List of constituencies of the Assam Legislative Assembly
1993 elections in India
Government of Himachal Pradesh

References

 State Assembly elections in Himachal Pradesh
1990s in Himachal Pradesh
Himachal